Perris Benegas (born 22 July 1995) is an American Freestyle BMX cyclist.

From Reno, Nevada she has a background in Muay Thai fighting. She lives with Kiah, her golden retriever  dog in Raleigh, North Carolina.

In 2018, Perris won the gold medal in Freestyle BMX park at the UCI Urban Cycling World Championships in Chengdu, China, with two other American women, Angie Marino and Hannah Roberts, taking second and third. She was named The 2020 Bloom BMX Freestyle Rider of the Year.

She has qualified to represent the United States at the 2020 Summer Olympics.

Personal life
Benegas is openly gay.

References

Living people
1995 births
BMX riders
American female cyclists
Sportspeople from Nevada
Lesbian sportswomen
Cyclists at the 2020 Summer Olympics
Olympic cyclists of the United States
American LGBT sportspeople
LGBT cyclists
21st-century American women